Velutina schneideri is a species of small sea snail, similar to a regular snail, a marine gastropod mollusk in the family Velutinidae.

Description

Distribution
Distribution of Velutina schneideri include European waters.

References

Velutinidae
Gastropods described in 1886